Arnold Issoko (born 6 April 1992) is a Congolese professional footballer who plays mainly as a right-back but also as a right winger.

International career
Issoko made his debut for the DR Congo national football team in a friendly 1–1 tie with Romania in May 2016.

References

External links

1992 births
Footballers from Kinshasa
21st-century Democratic Republic of the Congo people
Living people
Democratic Republic of the Congo footballers
Democratic Republic of the Congo international footballers
Association football forwards
Rebordosa A.C. players
A.D. Os Limianos players
G.D. Chaves players
Juventude de Pedras Salgadas players
Vitória F.C. players
Mumbai City FC players
Stade Malherbe Caen players
S.C. Farense players
C.D. Cova da Piedade players
S.C. Covilhã players
A.D. Sanjoanense players
Campeonato de Portugal (league) players
Liga Portugal 2 players
Primeira Liga players
Indian Super League players
Ligue 2 players
Democratic Republic of the Congo expatriate footballers
Democratic Republic of the Congo expatriate sportspeople in Portugal
Expatriate footballers in Portugal
Democratic Republic of the Congo expatriate sportspeople in India
Expatriate footballers in India
Democratic Republic of the Congo expatriate sportspeople in France
Expatriate footballers in France